The New Avengers is a fictional team of superheroes appearing in American comic books published by Marvel Comics. The title has been used for four American comic book series. The first two were written by Brian Michael Bendis and depicted a version of Marvel's premiere superhero team, the Avengers. The third was written by Jonathan Hickman and depicted a group of characters called the Illuminati (formerly introduced in New Avengers Vol. 1 #7 [July 2005]). The fourth is written by Al Ewing and depicts the former scientific terrorist group A.I.M., reformed as "Avengers Idea Mechanics", whose field team has appropriated the name "New Avengers" for itself.

Publication history

Volume 1 (2005–2010)

The New Avengers is a spin-off of the long-running Marvel Comics series The Avengers. The first issue, written by Brian Michael Bendis and penciled by David Finch, was dated January 2005 but appeared in November 2004. Finch penciled the first six issues and issues #11-13. Succeeding pencilers with multiple-issue runs include Steve McNiven, Leinil Francis Yu, Billy Tan, and Stuart Immonen. The roster at first comprises Luke Cage, Captain America, Iron Man, Spider-Man and "Spider-Woman" (Veranke). Later stretches included the mutant X-Man Wolverine, the unstable and godlike Sentry, and the deaf ninja Echo, in the guise of Ronin.

The team itself was not named the "New Avengers" within the series. A splinter group of Avengers that chose not to comply with federal superhuman registration, the team considers itself the authentic Avengers. A concurrent government-sanctioned team gathered in the sister series The Mighty Avengers. This series launched in early 2007 and was itself supplanted by a different government-sanctioned team in the series Dark Avengers, which was launched in late 2008. At this time the team welcomed Clint Barton (recently returned from the dead) as Ronin, as well as Doctor Strange and Iron Fist.

By the end of the first volume, the New Avengers team consisted of Ronin, Captain America (Bucky Barnes),   Ms. Marvel, Mockingbird, Spider-Man, Spider-Woman (Drew), Wolverine, and team leader Luke Cage. Writer Brian Michael Bendis said in an interview that these characters are the authentic Avengers because Captain America said they were. This statement is repeated when the team, believing Captain America (Rogers) is alive, attempts to rescue him. Spider-Man claims that if they get Captain America back, they can call themselves Avengers again. Luke Cage contends that they are Avengers already. The series ended with The New Avengers #64 (April 2010), at the conclusion of the "Siege" storyline. A one-shot titled The New Avengers: Finale was also released.

Volume 2 (2010–2012)
In March 2010, Marvel announced the series would be relaunched in June as part of the company's rebranding initiative, "Heroic Age" . In the first issue of the series, the new team consisted of Luke Cage, Victoria Hand, Iron Fist, Jessica Jones, Mockingbird, Ms. Marvel, Spider-Man, The Thing, and Wolverine. Wolverine and Spider-Man operated on the main Avengers team as well as the New Avengers, and Doctor Strange accepted an offer to join the team after their first mission while searching for the new Sorcerer Supreme after the death of Doctor Voodoo. Daredevil joined the team in issue #16 after accepting an offer from Luke Cage and Jessica Jones. Jessica left the team for personal reasons and was later joined by Luke Cage, thus ending that iteration of the team.

Volume 3 (2013–2015)
New Avengers was renumbered as a new volume in January 2013, written by Jonathan Hickman and originally drawn by Steve Epting. The new volume shifted its focus to the powerful group known as the Illuminati, which includes Black Bolt, Captain America, Doctor Strange, Iron Man, Mister Fantastic, and Namor, who reassembled to confront the threat of incursions. Black Panther and Reed Richards discovered that universal decay centered on Earth was causing universes to collide with one another, with Earth at the focal point. In issue #3, Black Panther, who had previously opposed the existence of the Illuminati, joined the group, and the Beast was brought in to fill the spot vacated by the death of Professor X. In the same issue, Captain America leaves. In issue #12, after having helped the Illuminati to defeat Thanos's army, Black Bolt's brother Maximus joined the team. Bruce Banner joined the team in Avengers Vol. 5 #28 after discovering the universal decay on his own.

Volume 4 (2015–2016)
Volume 4 of New Avengers launched in October 2015 as a part of the All-New, All-Different Marvel relaunch, written by Al Ewing with art by Gerardo Sandoval. The comic features a different team from the past three volumes: it focuses on A.I.M. (Advanced Idea Mechanics), a former super-villain group which has been rebranded as the Avengers Idea Mechanics, and their field team which has taken the name of the New Avengers. Sunspot is the new head of A.I.M., with Songbird as the field leader; other members include Wiccan, Hulkling, Squirrel Girl, Pod, Power Man, White Tiger, and Hawkeye as an open informant for S.H.I.E.L.D. Later, there is a schism in the team: Wiccan, Hulkling and Squirrel Girl are expelled from A.I.M. and informed by Sunspot that the three of them are now what remains of the New Avengers; during the same story, Cannonball was revealed to be working for A.I.M. as well. Hawkeye, who had been fired from S.H.I.E.L.D., later rejoins the trio of remaining New Avengers to form a lineup jokingly called "Wiccan's Kooky Quartet". During the events of Civil War II, the New Avengers assist A.I.M. on one last mission, which Hawkeye sits out for reasons of plausible deniability. After Sunspot's funeral, Advanced Idea Mechanics is declared officially dead so the team breaks up, but later reform as U.S.Avengers.

Fictional team biography

Assembling the Avengers
Following a reign of destruction by an insane Scarlet Witch, the Avengers disband. Six months later, with the Fantastic Four and the X-Men unable to act, the supervillain Electro shuts down power at the Raft, a "maximum-maximum security" prison for super-powered criminals, allowing for a mass breakout. "Jessica Drew (Spider-Woman)", an agent for the international law-enforcement agency S.H.I.E.L.D., is at the Raft with attorney Matt Murdock (Daredevil) and "hero for hire" Luke Cage. They are joined by Captain America, Iron Man, and Spider-Man. They are also assisted by a mentally unbalanced Sentry, who is imprisoned at the Raft. The riot is quelled, although 42 inmates escape. Captain America declares fate has brought this group together, just as it had the original Avengers. Most of the heroes agree to join the team. Daredevil refuses the offer and Sentry flies off.

The team's first mission is to capture the remaining super-powered criminals who escaped during the riot. The unexpected emergence of an unrelated team of youthful heroes, the Young Avengers, is also a matter of concern. There is also a growing sense of unease with S.H.I.E.L.D. after the disappearance of its leader, Nick Fury. The New Avengers travel to the Savage Land to capture the reptilian mutant Sauron, encountering resistance from the Savage Land Mutates (led by Brainchild) and a rogue squadron of S.H.I.E.L.D. agents led by Yelena Belova. During this conflict, Canadian mutant Wolverine joins the team (while maintaining concurrent membership in the X-Men). The group also recruits the Sentry, a powerful hero who erased all memory of his career from the world after he was manipulated by the mutant Mastermind and The General.

House of M and The Collective
With Xavier unable to repair the fractured psyche of the Scarlet Witch, the New Avengers and Cyclops' team of X-Men consider the alternatives. Fearful that the heroes are preparing to kill his sister, former Avenger Quicksilver convinces her to use her reality-altering powers to transform the planet and its history. Instantaneously, Magneto rules the planet under the banner of the "House of M", with mutants in the majority and non-powered humans as an oppressed minority. Reality is eventually restored, but the Scarlet Witch removes the superhuman abilities from over 99% of the mutants on Earth. These lost powers manifest as the Collective, the assembled energy of the depowered mutants. This energy is controlled by the intelligence known as Xorn (who once posed as Magneto) and uses the energy-wielder Michael Pointer as a host. The Avengers manage to separate the two after the Collective/Xorn attempts to re-power Magneto.

Civil War
After the reckless actions of the New Warriors result in the deaths of over 600 civilians in Stamford, Connecticut, Congress passes the Superhuman Registration Act, which requires all superhumans to register with the federal government. Many superheroes comply with this law, but others oppose the law on the grounds that it violates civil liberties. This ideological split leads to a Civil War within the New Avengers and the superhuman community at large, with Iron Man leading those who comply with the law, and Captain America leading those who oppose it. By the time that open hostilities between the two factions come to a close, Spider-Man's closely guarded secret identity is exposed to the world, and Bill Foster (one of Henry Pym's successors as Giant-Man) is killed. Shortly thereafter, Captain America is seemingly assassinated.

Avengers Underground
In the aftermath of the superhero civil war, the New Avengers become an unofficial group of unregistered heroes. The team moves to Doctor Strange's Sanctum Sanctorum in Greenwich Village, recruiting the resurrected Clint Barton (now using the name and costume of Ronin). They eventually relocate to an empty apartment building owned by Danny Rand's (Iron Fist) Rand Corporation, but leased in the name of Samuel Sterns (the Leader, an adversary of the Hulk).

Secret Invasion
Following this, the New Avengers play a major role in repelling the "Secret Invasion" of Earth by the Skrulls, a shapeshifting alien race which has sought to conquer the planet for years. In one confrontation, the team rescues several heroes who had been kidnapped and replaced by Skrull impostors at various unspecified times in the past. This includes the presumed-dead Mockingbird, wife of Clint Barton (Ronin), with whom she reunites. Additionally, it is revealed that Spider-Woman was replaced by the Skrull queen Veranke, prior to the prison break at The Raft that led to the formation of the New Avengers. Thus, Jessica Drew had never been a member of the team.

Dark Reign
Upon the Skrulls' defeat, S.H.I.E.L.D. is dismantled and replaced by H.A.M.M.E.R., a new intelligence agency. Norman Osborn (who has been Spider-Man's archenemy as the Green Goblin) is placed in control of H.A.M.M.E.R. and the Thunderbolts, while assembling a team of Avenger imposters composed of supervillains. Meanwhile, the revamped New Avengers roster consists of Captain America (Bucky Barnes), Luke Cage, Ronin, Mockingbird, Ms. Marvel, Spider-Man, the real Spider-Woman and Wolverine. Captain America offers these "new  Avengers" his home as a base of operations. Iron Fist announces he must leave the group to attend to personal business, but will remain on call. The team elects Ronin as leader (with Ms. Marvel as second-in-command), and persuades Spider-Man to once again reveal his secret identity to his fellow members.

Heroic Age
With the Registration Act having been revoked in the aftermath of the Siege of Asgard led by Osborn (who is incarcerated for his actions), Steve Rogers (the original Captain America, returned from his alleged death) reassembles the Avengers. Steve convinces a reluctant Luke Cage to be part of the new lineup after Tony Stark sells the reconstructed Avengers Mansion to Cage for a dollar, and Steve gives Cage carte blanche to maintain the New Avengers team, leading it as he sees fit. Given the freedom to recruit almost anyone he wants for the New Avengers team (except Iron Man or Thor), Cage selects Clint Barton (who has resumed the Hawkeye identity), Iron Fist, Jewel (Cage's wife Jessica Jones), Ms. Marvel, Mockingbird, Spider-Man, the Thing (who maintains concurrent membership in the Fantastic Four) and Wolverine. Rogers also sends him Victoria Hand on the grounds that she can provide the team with a unique insight from which Rogers feels they will benefit. Although Hawkeye leaves the team when a crisis comes up with the main Avengers team (claiming that he only joined them to spend time with his wife), the team later enlists a now-weakened Doctor Strange after he assists them in tackling a dimensional crisis. Squirrel Girl and Wong are hired as a super-powered babysitter for Cage's and Jewel's baby and mansion housekeeper respectively, although they do not serve directly on the main lineup of the New Avengers. Spider-Man appears to want to leave the team prior to the Fear Itself event due to his distrust of Victoria Hand and his new responsibilities in the Future Foundation, but subsequent conversations with Wolverine and Luke Cage convince him to remain an active member. After Fear Itself, the team lineup shifts, initially with the addition of Daredevil to the team and later with Jessica Jones leaving the team out of fear for her baby Danielle's safety.

Post AvX
Luke Cage leaves the team after the events of Avengers vs. X-Men to ensure the security of his wife and baby.

The remaining New Avengers band together with Doctor Strange when the Ghost of Daniel Drumm returns. He possesses each of the New Avengers and kills various evil sorcerers. Convinced that Daniel set his brother (Brother Voodoo) up to fail in his new role, Doctor Strange defeats him by using dark magic (recognizing that Drumm had only killed dark magic specialists while trying to frame Strange). As a result, Doctor Strange subsequently regains his position of Sorcerer Supreme.

Marvel NOW!
Under the Marvel NOW! label, a third volume of New Avengers was launched, written by Jonathan Hickman. With Hickman in charge of the entire Avengers line, New Avengers carried a parallel storyline to the main Avengers series. Rather than featuring a traditional team of Avengers, the book focused on the Illuminati. Black Panther joins Black Bolt, Captain America, Doctor Strange, Iron Man, Mister Fantastic, and Namor when faced with a universal threat. Beast joins the team as a replacement for the deceased Professor X.

Black Panther discovers a second Earth hanging above Wakanda and witnesses the Black Swan destroy the alternate Earth.<ref>'New Avengers Vol. 3 #1</ref> Black Panther captures and imprisons the Black Swan and reforms the Illuminati. Using the Black Swan's information, Reed Richards discovers the threat of Incursions, a multiversal chain reaction causing universes to collide with one another, with Earth of every universe at the focal point, resulting in the destruction of both universes unless one Earth is destroyed, allowing the other to pass through. As the Illuminati consider darker and darker avenues to save the universe, Captain America's steadfast morals are put at odds with the other members of the Illuminati. Captain America is voted out of the group with a spell of forgetfulness cast by Dr. Strange.

Faced with the possibility of having to destroy a world, the scientists of the Illuminati set about building a number of weapons, including a number of antimatter injection bombs similar to the one used by the Black Swan, a Dyson Sphere designed to weaponize the sun, a Builder Worldkiller ship kept in Jupiter's orbit, and a rogue planet kept slightly out-of-phase with Earth. The Illuminati survived a number of incursions using these and other methods; at one near Liberty Island, Galactus ate the alternate Earth, and they used an antimatter bomb to destroy a dead Earth over Latveria. During the Infinity event, alternate-universe Builders destroyed an Earth for the Illuminati. The event ended with the defeat of Thanos's forces and the capture of Thanos and his generals Proxima Midnight and Corvus Glaive, all three of whom were imprisoned in amber by Thanos's son Thane. They joined the Black Swan and Terrax the Enlightened as Illuminati prisoners.

The members of the Illuminati became increasingly cut off from the outside community as a result of their actions. Namor's kingdom was destroyed by Proxima Midnight during Thanos's invasion, and Black Panther was cast out of Wakanda for his alliance with Namor, with whom his sister Shuri was at war. Black Bolt and his brother Maximus faked the Inhuman king's death following the destruction of the Terrigen Bomb to allow the Inhumans to rebuild separately from the Illuminati's machinations. Doctor Strange, feeling increasingly cut off from his scientist-dominated colleagues, decided to empower himself to perhaps be able to solve the incursions, and so used the Blood Bible to travel to the Sinner's Market, where he sold his soul in exchange for godlike power. Upon discovering multiversal decay on his own after meeting an alternate version of himself, Bruce Banner confronted Tony Stark about what he'd been doing, and Stark brought him in as a member of the Illuminati.

Faced with a number of multiversal groups also trying to survive the incursion crisis - the faceless sorcerers the Black Priests, the adaptoid robots the Mapmakers, and the mysterious Ivory Kings - the Illuminati built a device to allow them to view other Earths' pasts so they could see how incursions there were handled. They learned about Mapmakers and Black Priests, but also discovered that the Black Swan had teamed up with alternate Illuminati groups in the past, and had even killed alternate versions of Iron Man and Reed Richards when they were no longer useful. Just before the team could confront Black Swan about her deception, another incursion occurred, this time pitting the Illuminati against the Great Society, a team of heroes which, like the Illuminati, had thus far fought off incursions to save its world.

Following an eight-month ellipsis during the Time Runs Out storyline, a new group calling themselves the New Avengers emerge. This team consists of former members of the Avengers who broke away from the main team after Captain America partnered with S.H.I.E.L.D. to hunt down the Illuminati.

All-New, All-Different Marvel
As part of the All-New, All-Different Marvel event, Sunspot's branch of the Avengers become the latest incarnation of the New Avengers. Their first opponent ended up being the terrorist organization W.H.I.S.P.E.R. (short for World Headquarters for International Scientific/Philosophical Experimentation and Research) that was founded by Mister Fantastic's Earth-1610 counterpart Maker and consisting of the former members of A.I.M. that were chased off by Sunspot. The New Avengers fought W.H.I.S.P.E.R. to destroy their Life-Minus experiment which involved capturing the souls of the dead in special crystals as part of a plan to create a new lifeform. The crystals were later destroyed by Songbird's sonic scream. The Life-Minus experiment also conjured up Moridun, a dark entity from the Fifth Cosmos (the Marvel Universe having recently been reborn in its eighth iteration in the events of Secret Wars).

The New Avengers encountered Moridun when he took over the body of M'Ryn the Magus — leader of the Knights of the Infinite, a magical order of Kree-Skrull hybrids who revealed Hulkling to be their prophesied future king. When Moridun attacked them and attempted to devour their souls, repeating the phrase "Life is horror", the New Avengers apparently defeated him — but Moridun planted a seed of his consciousness inside Billy Kaplan's mind and began to slowly infect him. Billy changed his codename from Wiccan to Demiurge, and began to act increasingly amoral. They were alerted to Moridun's survival when the Avengers of the year 20XX came back to the present day through A.I.M.'s new time machine, warning that Moridun would destroy Demiurge's soul completely and use his near-godlike power to almost completely destroy the world. Finding Billy already infected, the future Avengers tried to kill him; instead, with Hulkling's help, Billy was able to recognise Moridun's presence in his own mind and successfully defeat him on the mental plane, expelling Moridun from his body and mind.

The Maker engineered the prison break of Angela Del Toro, the former White Tiger, and presented her with the Tiger Amulet from the Ultimate Universe. She fought with Ava Ayala in Rome, causing the Tiger Gods from the two amulets to merge into one, leaving Del Toro with the powers of the White Tiger and Ava powerless.

In the Avengers: Standoff! crossover, A.I.M. received a distress call from Rick Jones when he is taken into S.H.I.E.L.D. custody. Hawkeye decided to break with S.H.I.E.L.D. for good and supported a rescue mission. Hulkling, Wiccan and Squirrel Girl, the only three dissenters, were expelled from A.I.M. and teleported to the desert – Sunspot also conferred the name of "New Avengers" on them. The remaining A.I.M. field team successfully rescued Rick from the Agents of S.H.I.E.L.D.'s battlecarrier. In response, the U.S. military launched an attack on Avengers Island with the American Kaiju (a Marine corporal transmogrified into a giant lizard monster) – as A.I.M. evacuated the island, they battled the monster with the mentally-controlled giant robot Avenger Five. Meanwhile, S.H.I.E.L.D. also launched a counterattack as led by John Garrett, forcing Songbird to reveal that she had been a deep-cover S.H.I.E.L.D. mole. The American Kaiju was defeated by forcing it back into human form. Rick Jones got cold feet about throwing in with A.I.M. and fled, and as a result S.H.I.E.L.D. successfully detained Hawkeye. The remainder of A.I.M. successfully evacuated to Avenger Two, a secondary base in the Savage Land run by Sunspot's old friend Cannonball.

Hawkeye was fired from S.H.I.E.L.D. for his betrayal. He, Wiccan, Hulkling and Squirrel Girl decided to re-form the New Avengers with Wiccan as the new team leader after fighting the Plunderer together. Meanwhile, Songbird openly became a S.H.I.E.L.D. agent, but was in fact still loyal to Sunspot.

Team roster

Collected editionsThe New Avengers has been collected in a series of editions that had both hardcover and trade paperback releases.

New Avengers Vol. 1 (2005)The New Avengers has also been collected in the following hardcovers:The New Avengers has also been collected in the following Complete Collections:The New Avengers has also been collected in the following Marvel Omnibus:

New Avengers Vol. 2 (2010)

New Avengers Vol. 3 (2013)

New Avengers Vol. 4 (2015)

In other media
Television
 The New Avengers appear in The Avengers: Earth's Mightiest Heroes. This version of the group is part of a fail-safe program developed by Tony Stark to ensure the world would still have heroes in the event that the Avengers are killed. In the New Avengers' self-titled episode, Kang the Conqueror traps the original Avengers in a temporal void, but Stark's computer systems bring Luke Cage, Iron Fist, Spider-Man, the Thing, War Machine, and Wolverine together to defeat Kang and save the original Avengers. In the series finale "Avengers Assemble!", the New Avengers reunite to help the original Avengers repel an attack from Galactus and his Heralds.
 A variation of the New Avengers called the All-New, All-Different Avengers are the main protagonists of Avengers: Secret Wars. This group is led by the Black Panther and consists of Captain Marvel, Ms. Marvel, the Vision, Ant-Man, and the Wasp.

Video games
 In Marvel: Ultimate Alliance, the New Avengers are considered a team bonus if the player has any combination of Luke Cage, Captain America, Iron Man, Spider-Man, Spider-Woman, and Wolverine on a team.
 In Marvel: Ultimate Alliance 2, the New Avengers are considered a team bonus if the player has any combination of Luke Cage, Iron Fist, Iron Man, Ms. Marvel, Spider-Man, and Wolverine.

Miscellaneous
The Breakout storyline seen in New Avengers Issues #1 to #6 was adapted into a prose novel written and adapted by comic writer Alisa Kwitney in January 2013 as part of the Marvel Prose Novel series. It is significantly altered to feature Hawkeye and Black Widow as the main featured characters due to their appearance and relationship in the Avengers'' movie, replacing Sentry and Wolverine in the story. Barton is depicted as a S.H.I.E.L.D. agent like his movie counterpart whilst Natasha is depicted as a rogue agent whose ties are unclear. As the events of "One More Day" had transpired, Spider-Man's reasons for his initial involvement is also altered. Jessica Drew and Luke Cage are retained as significant characters and are introduced to a new audience as a result.

References

External links
 
 
 The New Avengers at Marveldatabase.com

Comics characters introduced in 2005
2005 in comics
2010 in comics
2013 in comics
Avengers (comics) titles
Comics by Brian Michael Bendis
Comics by Jonathan Hickman